was a subunit from idol group AKB48's original Team A, produced by Yasushi Akimoto. The group is commonly referred as no3b, a stylized version of the group's name, which is a wasei-eigo term for sleeveless clothes.

History 
The trio debuted officially under the name No Sleeves in November 2008, but were previously grouped together and performed the songs "Junai no Crescendo" and "Bye Bye Bye" at AKB48 concerts and stage DVDs. , they have had eight Oricon top 10 singles. The group has released two digital singles under the name  for the TV Tokyo drama Men Dol: Ikemen Idol in which they starred.

After a year of inactivity following the release of their eighth single, "Pedicure Day" in December 2011, no3b joined as MC in Fuji TV's midnight ad lib music variety show  together with Tetsuya Komuro, Kosuke Suzuki, and Lily Franky, where they held their first recorded performance of the next single, "Kirigirisu Jin".

No Sleeves' songs featured in different media: "3seconds" and "Christmas Present" in the drama Men Dol: Ikemen Idol as insert songs, with "Relax!" as the theme song. "Tane" was used as the ending theme for the anime Birdy the Mighty Decode:02. "Kiss no Ryūsei" was used as the opening theme for the TBS ranking show  from December 2009 to January 2010. "Lie" was used as the ending theme for the TBS TV show . "Kimi Shika" as the mobile drama  theme song,  theme song and the variety show  theme song (August 2010). "Answer" was used as the ending theme to the anime Beelzebub. "Asatte, Jamaica" as the mobile drama  theme song. "Kirigirisu Jin" as Fuji TV variety show Snack Kissa Eden insert song and ending theme. "Iin Ja Ne?" as the TV drama  theme song.

The group reunited for their 10th Anniversary Live Performance on November 26, 2018.

Members 
Haruna Kojima
Minami Minegishi
Minami Takahashi

Discography

Albums

Singles 

* Unofficial figure obtained by adding together Oricon sales numbers for different periods of time when the single or album charted on Oricon.
** RIAJ Digital Track Chart was shut down in July 2012.

Media appearances

TV programs

Dramas

Radio

References

External links 
 
 Sony Music profile
 Oricon interview in Japanese

AKB48 sub-units
Japanese idol groups
Japanese girl groups
Japanese pop music groups
Musical groups established in 2008
Japanese musical trios
Musical groups disestablished in 2013
Sony Music Entertainment Japan artists